Anthene coerulea, the mauve ciliate blue, is a butterfly in the family Lycaenidae. It is found in eastern Nigeria and western Cameroon.

References

Butterflies described in 1895
Anthene
Butterflies of Africa